"Gimme Some More" is a song by American rapper Busta Rhymes, released on October 26, 1998 by Elektra Records. The single serves as the lead single released from his third solo album E.L.E. (Extinction Level Event): The Final World Front (1998). It is often considered to be the very summit of Busta's complex, breathless, high-speed rhyming delivery most prominent in his early work. The song was produced by regular Busta collaborator DJ Scratch. The violin riffs that accompany the main beat are sampled from the opening theme to Alfred Hitchcock's 1960 film Psycho, composed by Bernard Herrmann.

In 2000, it was nominated for Best Rap Solo Performance at the Grammy Awards, but it lost to Eminem's "My Name Is." Rhymes first performed the song live with The Roots on Saturday Night Live with "Tear da Roof Off" on February 13, 1999. He also performed the song live in 1999 at MTV Spring Break, the 1999 Soul Train Music Awards, at the Knitting Factory Brooklyn, New York in 2008, and at The Brooklyn Hip-Hop Festival in 2012.

Music video
The music video for "Gimme Some More" was directed by Hype Williams along with Busta Rhymes himself, credited there as Busta Remo. Like many of Busta's earlier music videos, it is shot through fisheye lens in fast motion and is largely absurdist in nature. Opening up with a Looney Tunes-like intro, the video begins with Busta Rhymes narrating in the background, recalling how he once bumped his head as a child. A little boy portraying Busta as a child acts this out. A woman runs out of house to the aid of him. Suddenly, the child turns into a hideous, little blue monster with big yellow eyes and sharp teeth, and chases the woman around and throughout the house. The story is intercut with scenes of Busta Rhymes and other members of Flip Mode Squad in various random costumes and situations. Busta is seen as a boxer, stock broker, police officer, miner, pistol-toting, Yosemite Sam-like Texan, body builder, pimp and a person tied up about to get run over by a train a la The Perils of Pauline. The video ends on an unresolved cliffhanger, with the woman trapped on top of a refrigerator and the monster climbing closer and closer towards her.

It was nominated for Breakthrough Video at the 1999 MTV Video Music Awards. A VHS tape of the music video came free with a purchase of the album E.L.E. (Extinction Level Event): The Final World Front.

Track listing

CD single
"Gimme Some More" (Clean Version)
"Gimme Some More" (Dirty Version)
"Do It Like Never Before"

Chart

Weekly charts

Year-end charts

References

1998 singles
Busta Rhymes songs
Music videos directed by Hype Williams
Songs written by Busta Rhymes
Patter songs
Psycho (franchise)
Comedy rap songs